Torrisi is an uncommon Italian surname with approximately 13,000 people using this name - mostly of Italian descent. Notable people with the surname include:

David Torrisi (born 1968), American attorney and politician
Laura Torrisi (born 1979), Italian actress
Nedelle Torrisi, American musician
Paolo Torrisi (1951–2005), Italian voice actor and actor
Paul Torrisi (born 1970), English businesspeople
Pietro Torrisi (born 1940), Italian stuntman and actor
Stefano Torrisi (born 1971), Italian former footballer

Italian-language surnames